Graham John Ward (born 25 October 1955) is an English theologian and Anglican priest who has been Regius Professor of Divinity at the University of Oxford since 2012.  As Regius Professor, he is ex officio a member of the College of Canons and Cathedral chapter of Christ Church, Oxford. He is a priest of the Church of England and was formerly the Samuel Ferguson Professor of Philosophical Theology and Ethics and the Head of the School of Arts, Histories and Cultures at the University of Manchester. Previous to that he was the Professor of Contextual Theology and Ethics (1998–2009) and Senior Fellow in Religion and Gender (1997–98) at the university.

Prior to this he was, successively, a chaplain and fellow at Exeter College, Oxford, a part-time lecturer at the University of Birmingham and the Dean and Director of Studies for Theology at Peterhouse, Cambridge. He was ordained deacon in 1990 and priest in 1991, having originally studied English and French at Fitzwilliam College, Cambridge, and then studied theology at Selwyn College while training for ordination at Westcott House.

Ward has engaged in different fields of theology, especially postmodern theology, and other disciplines such as philosophy, psychoanalysis, gender studies, and queer theory. He has written on the theology of language, postmodernism, cultural analysis, and christology. His contemporary research focuses on Christian social ethics, political theory and cultural hermeneutics. He is editor of three book series: Radical Orthodoxy (Routledge), Christian Theology in Context (OUP) and Illuminations: Religion & Theory (Blackwell).

Views

In Cities of God, Ward declared his support for 'same-sex unions':
For me, something of that standpoint is composed of the fact that I am a male, Christian theologian who openly advocates same-sex unions, who has friends dying or living with the fear of AIDS, and a family who lives the shadows, embarrassments and sufferings of a genetic disorder But each of us moves out from where we are placed and place ourselves, and in doing so understands that we are also elsewhere.

Books and edited volumes
Another Kind of Normal: Ethical Life II (Oxford University Press, 2022), 
Theology and Religion: Why is Matters (Polity, 2019), 
Unimaginable: What We Imagine and What We Can't (I.B.Tauris & Co Ltd, 2018) 
How the Light Gets In: Ethical Life I (Oxford University Press, 2016), 
Unbelievable: Why We Believe and Why We Don't (I.B.Tauris & Co Ltd, 2014), 
The Politics of Discipleship: Becoming Postmaterial Citizens (SCM Press, 2009), 
Christ and Culture (Blackwell, 2005), 
Cultural Transformation and Religious Practice (Cambridge University Press, 2004), 
True Religion (Blackwell, 2002), 
Cities of God (Routledge, 2000), 
Theology and Contemporary Critical Theory (Macmillan, 1996, 2nd edition 2000), 
Barth, Derrida and the language of theology (Cambridge University Press, 1995), 
(Edited, with Michael Hoelzl) Religion and Political Thought (Continuum, 2006), 
(Edited) The Blackwell Companion to Postmodern Theology (Blackwell, 2004), 
(Edited) The Certeau Reader (2000), 
(Edited) Theology and Masculinity  (The Journal of Men's Studies, Vol. 7, 1999)
(Edited, with John Milbank and Catherine Pickstock) Radical Orthodoxy: a New Theology (Routledge, 1998), 
(Edited) The Postmodern God: a Theological Reader (Blackwell, 1997),

See also
Ward has additionally rejected pantheism, pandeism and process thought. 
The City of God (Augustine)

References

External links
Graham Ward at the Religion and Civil Society Network
Interview with Graham Ward
Theology and Masculinity - The Journal of Men's Studies
 Regius Professor of Divinity announcement
University of Oxford - Regius Professor of Divinity - Graham Ward

1955 births
Living people
LGBT and Anglicanism
British Christian theologians
English Anglican theologians
Alumni of Fitzwilliam College, Cambridge
Alumni of Selwyn College, Cambridge
Academics of the University of Manchester
Academics of the University of Birmingham
Christian continental philosophers and theologians
Fellows of Exeter College, Oxford
Fellows of Peterhouse, Cambridge
Alumni of Westcott House, Cambridge
Regius Professors of Divinity (University of Oxford)